Nepen Diakha is a locality situated in the Kédougou Region, Senegal. The highest point of the country is located 2.7 km southeast of Nepen Diakha on Baunez ridge defining the border with Guinea. There there is a 648 meters (2,126 feet) above sea level spot height, on the 1983, very detailed, five-meter contour interval 1:25,000 scale topographic map sheet 2049I SE produced by the joint Senegal-Guinea Organization for the Development of the River Gambia with "topography by photogrammetric methods" from US-flown aerial images.  SRTM data shows a 642-meter elevation here.

The village of Nepin Peul is the closest locality to this ridge.

See also
Geography of Senegal
List of countries by highest point

External links
 Nepen Diakha Map — Satellite Images of Nepen Diakha, Maplandia.com.

Nepen Diakha
Highest points of countries